Pittosporum orohenense is a species of plant in the Pittosporaceae family. It is endemic to French Polynesia.

References

Endemic flora of French Polynesia
orohenense
Vulnerable plants
Taxonomy articles created by Polbot